Gabarnaudia is a genus of anamorphic fungi in the family Ceratocystidaceae. The genus, circumscribed in 1974, is named in honor of French mycologist Gabriel Arnaud. It contains five species that are known from Asia and Europe.

References

External links

Sordariomycetes genera
Microascales